The 2014 Montreux Volley Masters was a women's volleyball competition held in Montreux, Switzerland between May 27 – June 1, 2014. Eight teams participated in this tournament.

Germany defeated United States to win their first title, with Margareta Kozuch being awarded Most Valuable Player.

Participating teams

Group stage

Group A

|}

|}

Group B

|}

|}

Classification round

5th–8th place

|}

5th place match

|}

Final round

Semifinals

|}

Third place match

|}

Final

|}

Final standings

Awards
 MVP: 
 Best Scorer: 
 Best Spiker: 
 Best Blocker: 
 Best Setter: 
 Best Server: 
 Best Receiver: 
 Best Libero:

References

External links
Official website

2014
Montreux Volley Masters
Montreux Volley Masters